The 1977 Eastern 8 men's basketball tournament was the first edition of the men's basketball postseason competition now known as the Atlantic 10 men's basketball tournament. It was organized by the Eastern Collegiate Basketball League, popularly known as the "Eastern 8", an NCAA Division I basketball-only conference that was formally founded in 1975 and began competition in the 1976–77 season. The conference added sports other than basketball starting with the 1977–78 school year, changing its name to the Eastern Athletic Association, and adopted its current name of Atlantic 10 Conference in 1982.

The inaugural tournament winner was the Duquesne team.

Bracket

External links

Atlantic 10 men's basketball tournament
Tournament
Basketball in Philadelphia
Eastern 8 men's basketball tournament
Eastern 8 men's basketball tournament